Meadow Lakes is a census-designated place (CDP) in Matanuska-Susitna Borough, Alaska, United States. Located west of Wasilla, it is part of the Anchorage, Alaska Metropolitan Statistical Area. As of the 2020 census, the population was 9,197, up from 7,570 in 2010. It is the fifth-most populated CDP in Alaska and the third largest community in the borough.

Geography
Meadow Lakes is located at  (61.599661, -149.616036).

Demographics

Meadow Lakes first reported on the 1990 U.S. Census as a census-designated place (CDP).

As of the census of 2000, there were 4,819 people, 1,702 households, and 1,215 families residing in the CDP. There were 2,003 housing units at an average density of 29.9/sq mi (11.5/km2). The racial makeup of the CDP was 87.9% White, 0.5% Black or African American, 5.4% Native American, 0.6% Asian, 0.2% Pacific Islander, 0.6% from other races, and 4.8% from two or more races.  3.0% of the population were Hispanic or Latino of any race.

There were 1,702 households, out of which 42.5% had children under the age of 18 living with them, 55.1% were married couples living together, 9.2% had a female householder with no husband present, and 28.6% were non-families. 20.9% of all households were made up of individuals, and 3.3% had someone living alone who was 65 years of age or older.  The average household size was 2.83 and the average family size was 3.30.

In the CDP, the population was spread out, with 33.4% under the age of 18, 7.1% from 18 to 24, 32.5% from 25 to 44, 22.2% from 45 to 64, and 4.9% who were 65 years of age or older.  The median age was 33 years. For every 100 females, there were 113.8 males.  For every 100 females age 18 and over, there were 111.5 males.

The median income for a household in the CDP was $41,030, and the median income for a family was $47,534. Males had a median income of $40,948 versus $26,148 for females. The per capita income for the CDP was $17,295.  About 12.3% of families and 17.1% of the population were below the poverty line, including 23.7% of those under age 18 and 5.0% of those age 65 or over.

References

Census-designated places in Matanuska-Susitna Borough, Alaska
Census-designated places in Alaska
Anchorage metropolitan area